Alfatar is a town in Silistra Province, Northeastern Bulgaria, located in  to the south of the town of Silistra. It is the administrative centre of the homonymous Alfatar Municipality. As of December 2009, the town has a population of 1,714 inhabitants.

The Alfatar Peninsula on Robert Island, South Shetland Islands is named after Alfatar.

Population
As of December 2018, the town of Alfatar has a dwindling population of 1,395 people, down from its peak of 4,358 people shortly after the Second World War. Alfatar is exclusively inhabited by ethnic Bulgarians (100%).

References

Towns in Bulgaria
Populated places in Silistra Province